Trust Me is a 2010 comedy drama film written and directed by Johan Kling, starring an ensemble cast including Alexander Skarsgård, Susanne Thorson, Gustaf Skarsgård and Philomène Grandin. The film focuses on a group of young people running a small theater in Stockholm.

Cast
 Alexander Skarsgård as Alex
 Susanne Thorson as Katja
 Gustaf Skarsgård as Jon
 Moa Gammel as Mia
 Richard Ulfsäter as Andreas
 Philomène Grandin as Jessica
 Erica Carlson as Anna
 Peter Carlberg as the homeless
 Michelle Meadows as Michy
 Michael Segerström as Pikner
 Jessica Zandén as Jessica's mother
 Vera Vitali as Natalie
 Gitte Witt as the darkness
 Victor von Schirach as cashier
 Lotti Törnros as Lotten
 Lars Bringås as Sebastian

Production
Trust Me was produced by St Paul Film in co-production with Nordisk Film, Sveriges Television, Canal+ and the Norwegian company Spillefilmkompaniet 4½. It received seven million SEK from the Swedish Film Institute, plus support from Nordisk Film- & TV Fond and local funds in Stockholm and Gotland. The total budget was 21.5 million SEK. Filming started in September 2008, but after only ten days Johan Kling experienced a burnout and the production was postponed. "I felt like Lord Jim who left his own ship", the director later commented. Filming resumed the following August and principal shooting ended in October 2009.

References

External links
 
 

2010 films
2010 comedy-drama films
2010s Swedish films
2010s Swedish-language films
Films set in Stockholm
Norwegian comedy-drama films
Swedish comedy-drama films